Chunky is a candy bar with milk chocolate, raisins, and roasted peanuts — using a sectioned and truncated pyramid shape.  Chunky is produced by Ferrara Candy Company, a division of Ferrero SpA.

History
The Chunky candy bar was introduced in the late 1930s by New York City candy maker Philip Silvershein, at the time made with milk chocolate, raisins, cashews and Brazil nuts.  Silvershein, a friend of William Wrigley Jr., distributed the bar via the Wrigley Gum Company.  When Nestlé assumed rights to the brand in 1984, it changed the ingredients to milk chocolate, raisins and peanuts. In 2018, Ferrero SpA purchased Nestlé's U.S. candy line, which included Chunky.

In the 1950s, a Chunky could be purchased for five cents (as could most candy bars), with a smaller version, the Chunky Cutie, available for two cents.

Advertising
"Chunky Square", a pavilion at the 1964 New York World's Fair, featured a glass-walled automated factory, where visitors could watch the manufacturing of Chunky candy bars.

An early 1970s TV commercial for Chunky showed a young boy watching TV with his father. The boy amused viewers by claiming that Chunky was "THICKER-ER".  The candy bar used the "Thicker-er" campaign into the 1980s.

Other Chunky advertising slogans included "Chunky, What a Chunk o' Chocolate", intoned by the nasal voice of Arnold Stang, and "Open Wide for Chunky".

Varieties
 Original – milk chocolate, peanuts and raisins – silver wrapper
 Pecan Chunky (discontinued) – milk chocolate, pecans only – gold wrapper
 Dark Chunky (discontinued) – dark chocolate, peanuts and raisins – gold wrapper
 Deluxe Nut (discontinued) – milk chocolate, peanuts, almonds, cashews, and hazelnuts – gold wrapper
 Solid Milk Chocolate (discontinued) – milk chocolate only – brown wrapper
 Miniatures ("Cuties") (discontinued) – same as originals but 1"x 1"x 3/4" thick (individually wrapped), in a poly-bag

References

Brand name confectionery
Chocolate bars
Peanut dishes
Candy